The 1954 Soviet Cup was an association football cup competition of the Soviet Union.

Competition schedule

First round
 [Aug 15]
 ISKRA Frunze                 11-1  ProfSoyuzy Frunze 
   [Churikov-3, Malyarenko-3, Zykov-3, Boikov-2 – Kolomiytsev] 
 PROFSOYUZY Leninabad          4-3  Gornyak Leninabad 
 SPARTAK Ashkhabad            12-1  Urozhai Ashkhabad 
   [Moroz-3, Yepikhin-3, Oganov-2, Maduntsev-2, Borkin-2 – Vorobyov] 
 SPARTAK Tashkent              5-0  ODO Tashkent 
   [Tazetdinov-2, Vitkalov-2, Zhigalkin] 
 [Aug 18] 
 BUREVESTNIK Kishinev          3-2  Lokomotiv Ungeny 
   [Popov-2, Fomin – Petrov-2] 
 Inkaras Kaunas                0-2  SPARTAK Vilnius 
   [Raimondas Beinoravicius, Romualdas Lutkevicius] 
 KALEV Tallinn                 4-0  Sokol Tallinn 
   [Kuller-2, Ivanov, Kornev] 
 KRASNAYA ZVEZDA Petrozavodsk  3-0  Dinamo Petrozavodsk 
   [Kornilov-2, Shelekhov] 
 Krasny Metallurg Liepaja      0-1  DAUGAVA Riga 
   [Pavlovich 9] 
 NEFTYANIK Baku                2-1  ZiB Baku 
   [Batashov-2 – Kevorkov] 
 Neftyanik Krasnodar           1-2  SHAKHTYOR Mosbass 
   [? – I.Yakushkin, M.Petrov] 
 [Aug 20] 
 MASHINOSTROITEL Kiev          1-0  Krylya Sovetov Voronezh 
   [Romanovskiy] 
 [Aug 25] 
 LOKOMOTIV Alma-Ata            2-1  Dinamo Alma-Ata 
 ODO Kiev                      w/o  ODO Sverdlovsk  
 ODO Tbilisi                   2-0  TTU Tbilisi 
   [B.Koverznev, A.Norakidze] 
 SPARTAK Yerevan               3-0  Kirovakan 
   [Boyajan, Beglaryan, Abramyan]

Second round
 [Aug 17] 
 METALLURG Dnepropetrovsk      6-0  Avangard Sverdlovsk 
   [Kolosov 19, Beletskiy 34, Didevich 42, 69, ?, Gurkin 56] 
 Zenit Kaliningrad (M.R.)      1-4  SPARTAK Uzhgorod 
   [Stepanov – Kalinov, Preznanskiy] 
 [Aug 18] 
 DINAMO-2 Moskva               3-2  DOF Sevastopol 
   [Trofimov-2, Tsaritsyn – Muhamadeyev, Makhov] 
 Krasnoye Znamya Ivanovo       1-3  SHAKHTYOR Stalino    [aet]  [in Moskva] 
   [E.Kapanakov – Alexandr Alpatov, A.Motin, Y.Zaitsev] 
 TORPEDO Rostov-na-Donu        3-1  Spartak Kalinin 
   [A.Grigorov, V.Kruglov, Y.Zakharov – Klimakov] 
 [Aug 20] 
 ProfSoyuzy Leninabad          2-3  SPARTAK Tashkent        [aet] 
   [Chistov, Ivlev – Vitkalov, Breslavets, Tazetdinov] 
 [Aug 22] 
 ISKRA Frunze                  3-1  Spartak Ashkhabad 
   [Boikov-2, Churikov – Borkin] 
 KRYLYA SOVETOV Molotov        2-1  Energiya Saratov 
   [Ratushny, Shavshunov – Larin] 
 Neftyanik Baku                1-4  ODO Kiev 
   [Mikuchadze – Bondarenko-2, Fursov, A.Bogdanovich] 
 [Aug 25] 
 ODO Leningrad                 4-0  Avangard Chelyabinsk 
   [Salahadinov-2, Nell, Kulikov] 
 [Aug 28] 
 PISHCHEVIK Minsk              2-0  Torpedo Vitebsk 
   [V.Stadnikov, B.Gritsuk] 
 SPARTAK Vilnius               2-0  Kalev Tallinn 
   [Raimondas Beinoravicius, Romualdas Lutkevicius] 
 [Aug 29] 
 Krasnaya Zvezda Petrozavodsk  1-2  BUREVESTNIK Kishinev 
   [Konstantinov – Mukhortov, Myndru] 
 Mashinostroitel Kiev          0-0  Khimik Moskva 
 ODO Lvov                      3-1  Metallurg Zaporozhye 
   [E.Tsitsei-2, Chepiga – Pavlov] 
 ODO Tbilisi                   3-0  Daugava Riga 
   [A.Norakidze, D.Podlesny, B.Koverznev] 
 [Sep 3] 
 ODO Khabarovsk                w/o  Torpedo Stalingrad 
 SHAKHTYOR Mosbass             2-0  Metallurg Odessa 
   [P.Smirnov, V.Uskov] 
 SPARTAK Yerevan               w/o  Lokomotiv Alma-Ata

Second round replays
 [Aug 30] 
 Mashinostroitel Kiev          1-6  KHIMIK Moskva 
   [Kashlyk – Fyodorov-2, Papilov, Ryakhov, Rogov, Abramov]

Third round
 [Aug 26] 
 TORPEDO Gorkiy                4-2  Krylya Sovetov Molotov 
   [Vladimir Lazarev-2, Nikolai Matveyev, Nikolai Yefimov – Nikiforov, Viktor Belov (T) og] 
 [Aug 27] 
 LOKOMOTIV Moskva              4-0  Spartak Tashkent 
   [Ivan Larin, Alexandr Filyayev, Yuriy Korotkov, Zverinskiy (S) og] 
 [Aug 29] 
 ODO Leningrad                 3-2  Trudoviye Rezervy Leningrad 
   [Petsyunevich, Salahadinov, Vikhenskiy – Kolobov, Sochnev] 
 [Aug 30] 
 SPARTAK Moskva                3-1  Dinamo Moskva 
   [Nikolai Parshin 25, 64, Nikolai Dementyev 59 – Vladimir Ilyin 32] 
 [Sep 5] 
 Lokomotiv Kharkov             1-3  SPARTAK Uzhgorod 
   [P.Ponomarenko – Preznanskiy-2, D.Tovt] 
 SPARTAK Minsk                 4-0  ODO Kiev 
   [Boris Kurnev 15, Vladilen Golubev 58 pen, Igor Bachurin 72, ?] 
 [Sep 6] 
 Pishchevik Minsk              0-3  KHIMIK Moskva                [aet] 
   [I.Abramov-2, G.Borisov] 
 [Sep 7] 
 BUREVESTNIK Kishinev          1-0  ODO Tbilisi                  [aet] 
   [Mikhail Mukhortov] 
 Dinamo-2 Moskva               1-2  ZENIT Leningrad 
   [M.Shlyonov 30 – Yuriy Volodin 19, 63] 
 [Sep 12] 
 Shakhtyor Stalino             2-2  Dinamo Tbilisi 
   [Ivan Fedosov 9, Ivan Boboshko 48 – Boris Khasaia 46, Avtandil Gogoberidze 63] 
 [Sep 15] 
 Torpedo Rostov-na-Donu        0-4  CDSA Moskva 
   [Valentin Yemyshev-2, Anatoliy Savin, Vasiliy Buzunov] 
 [Sep 16] 
 DINAMO Kiev                   4-2  Spartak Vilnius 
   [Andrei Zazroyev 3, 9, 30, Georgiy Grammatikopulo 60 - Romualdas Lutkevicius 57, Raimondas Beinoravicius 70] 
 [Sep 18] 
 ODO Lvov                      3-2  Krylya Sovetov Kuibyshev 
   [E.Tsitsei, Pozdnyakov (K) og, Guzik (K) og – Viktor Voroshilov-2] 
 [Sep 19] 
 TORPEDO Moskva                3-0  ODO Khabarovsk 
   [Yuriy Zolotov-2, Anatoliy A.Ilyin] 
 [Sep 23] 
 METALLURG Dnepropetrovsk      w/o  Iskra Frunze 
 Shakhtyor Mosbass             0-3  SPARTAK Yerevan 
   [Karajan-2, Abramyan]

Third round replays
 [Sep 13] 
 SHAKHTYOR Stalino             1-0  Dinamo Tbilisi 
   [Alexandr Alpatov]

Fourth round
 [Sep 8] 
 METALLURG Dnepropetrovsk      5-3  Torpedo Gorkiy 
   [Didevich 6, ?, Gurkin 9, Kozachenko 25, Gorovoi 90 – Nikolai Matveyev 31, Nikolai Yefimov ? pen, ? pen] 
 [Sep 12] 
 ODO Leningrad                 3-1  Burevestnik Kishinev 
   [Korolyov-2, Salahadinov – Danilov] 
 [Sep 17] 
 ZENIT Leningrad               2-0  Lokomotiv Moskva 
   [Vladimir Dobrikov ?, 71] 
 [Sep 23] 
 SHAKHTYOR Stalino             3-1  Spartak Uzhgorod 
   [Samoilov-2, Alexandr Alpatov – Tovt] 
 [Sep 29] 
 SPARTAK Yerevan               2-0  Spartak Minsk    
   [O.Abramyan, A.Boyajan] 
 [Oct 1] 
 ODO Lvov                      0-1  KHIMIK Moskva 
   [Fyodorov] 
 [Oct 3] 
 Spartak Moskva                1-3  DINAMO Kiev 
   [Anatoliy Isayev 26 – Mikhail Koman 41, 73, Andrei Zazroyev 51] 
 [Oct 5] 
 CDSA Moskva                   1-0  Torpedo Moskva               [aet] 
   [Boris Khrenov (T) 120 og]

Quarterfinals
 [Sep 22] 
 METALLURG Dnepropetrovsk      2-1  ODO Leningrad                [aet] 
   [Filatov ?, M.Gurkin 119 – Kulikov 87] 
 [Oct 5] 
 SPARTAK Yerevan               1-0  Shakhtyor Stalino 
   [A.Kegeyan 34] 
 [Oct 6] 
 ZENIT Leningrad               2-0  Khimik Moskva 
   [Pyotr Katrovskiy 12, Vladimir Dobrikov 65 pen] 
 [Oct 12] 
 DINAMO Kiev                   3-1  CDSA Moskva                  [aet] 
   [Mikhail Koman 1, 106, Viktor Fomin 120 – Valentin Yemyshev 75]

Semifinals
 [Oct 11] 
 SPARTAK Yerevan               4-0  Metallurg Dnepropetrovsk             [in Moskva] 
   [K.Vardanyan 1, 28, A.Kegeyan 31, Abramyan 57] 
 [Oct 16] 
 DINAMO Kiev                   1-0  Zenit Leningrad              [aet]   [in Moskva] 
   [Alexandr Koltsov 113]

Final

External links
 Complete calendar. helmsoccer.narod.ru
 1954 Soviet Cup. Footballfacts.ru
 1954 Soviet football season. RSSSF

Soviet Cup seasons
Cup
Soviet Cup
Soviet Cup